August Willemsen (16 June 1936 in Amsterdam – 29 November 2007 in Amsterdam) was a Dutch translator of Portuguese and Brazilian literature. He also published essays, diaries and letters. Willemsen was known for his powerful use of the Dutch language and his flawless style.

Biography 
After completing his secondary education in Amsterdam, Willemsen enrolled at the Conservatorium to study the piano. He decided, however, that literature was his first choice and, at a relatively late age, he began studying Portuguese. His translations of the Portuguese poet Fernando Pessoa gained him recognition as a leading translator. Till his death on 29 November 2007, Willemsen was working on translating Pessoa's entire oeuvre.

Limited bibliography 
 Braziliaanse brieven, letters from Willemsen, who lived in Brazil at the time of writing, to his friends. He writes about the country, the people, the culture and the conservative Dutch expats (1985).
 De taal als bril, essays (1987).
 Een liefde in het Zuiden, en De dood in Zuid, two stories that were later included in Vrienden, vreemden, vrouwen (1988).
 De val, diary about the months during which Willemsen was recovering from a fall that was caused by an alcohol addiction. (1991).
 De Goddelijke Kanarie, lyrical history of Brazilian soccer (1994).
 Het hoogste woord, beschouwingen en boutades, essays (1994).
 Sprekend een brief, letter to  about the decision to start living in Australia (1998).
 Vrienden, vreemden, vrouwen, diary of the adolescent Willemsen, with critiques from the present day Willemsen (1998).
 De tuin van IJben, youth essay of a school trip to France (1999).
 Van Tibooburra naar Packsaddle (with ), essays about Australia, backpacking, Aboriginals and sports (2001).

Translations 
 Carlos Drummond de Andrade
 Machado de Assis
 Hector Malot, Alleen op de wereld.
 Fernando Pessoa
 Graciliano Ramos
 João Guimarães Rosa

External links
 Radio-interview with Willemsen; a VPRO broadcast, duration: three hours.

Dutch translators
Translators to Dutch
Translators of Fernando Pessoa
1936 births
2007 deaths
Writers from Amsterdam
20th-century translators
Translators from Portuguese